Samuel Ledor (born December 15, 1986 in Rivers State) is a Nigerian football player currently with Lobi Stars F.C.

Career
Ledor began his career with Enugu Rangers and joined in 2005 to Enyimba International F.C. After four years left Enyimba and joined in March 2010 on loan to Gateway F.C. After a short term with Gateway on loan was signed in September of the same year by Republic of the Congo side Saint-Michel d'Ouenzé. In September 2011 would sign with Etoile de Sahel, but the transfer collapsed. On 10 January 2012 signed a one-year contract for Sharks F.C.

References

1986 births
Living people
Nigerian footballers
Association football midfielders
Enyimba F.C. players
Expatriate footballers in Tunisia
Rangers International F.C. players
Expatriate footballers in the Republic of the Congo
Étoile Sportive du Sahel players
Nigerian expatriate footballers
Sharks F.C. players
Nigerian expatriate sportspeople in Tunisia
Gateway United F.C. players
Nigerian expatriate sportspeople in the Republic of the Congo
Lobi Stars F.C. players
Nigeria international footballers